The Tracy Learning Center is a charter school located in Tracy, California, USA. Serving students in grades K–12, it was founded in 2001 and had an enrollment of 125 students. Charter status was awarded in June 2002. It was decided, in June 2003, to relocate the Tracy Learning Center to the Clover Middle School site and to expand it to become a K–12 charter school. Expansion of the school was completed in 2007, with the addition of the senior class, that took numbers up to 850.

For the 2011–12 school year, the Tracy Learning Center has a population of over 1100 students K-12.  It continues to be one of the highest ranked schools in San Joaquin County.

Millennium

Tracy Learning Center's high school, Millennium, has a unique nest point system that revolves around their mascot, the falcon. Each grade level is assigned a nest whose name originates from real falcons. Members of the nest with the most points by the end of the year will earn a reward of some form. Points are awarded or deducted from individual students based on behavior and academic performance.

According to Niche, a national education-ranking agency, Millennium scored an overall grade of B+, making it the fifth best charter school in San Joaquin County. Factors taken into account include quality of teachers, parent and student reviews, activities, and design of curriculum. Their average SAT score is an 1130, and most students did better in English than Mathematics. They have addressed this issue by redesigning the math curriculum in 2019.

Millennium has a full range of Division V athletic teams in the California Interscholastic Federation (CIF). Another notable activity is the marching band and colorguard, which participates in competitions hosted by the Northern California Band Association (NCBA). They are classified either in the 1A or 2A category. Other clubs and activities include Academic Decathlon and Speech and Debate.

References

External links
 Official website

 Education Week: A New Classroom Look
 ICOSA Magazine: Transforming America's Schools

High schools in San Joaquin County, California
Charter K-12 schools in California
Tracy, California
Educational institutions established in 2001
2001 establishments in California